Franz Schweigger-Seidel (September 24, 1834 – August 23, 1871) was a German physiologist born in Halle an der Saale. He was the son of chemist Franz Wilhelm Schweigger-Seidel (1795-1838).

In 1858 he obtained his doctorate from the University of Halle with a dissertation titled Disquisitiones de callo. Afterwards he served as an assistant to Rudolf Heidenhain (1834-1897) at the physiological institute in Breslau, and from 1865 was an assistant to Carl Ludwig (1816-1895) at the University of Leipzig. In 1866 he received his habilitation, and during the following year became an associate professor at Leipzig.

His name is associated with "Schweigger-Seidel sheaths", which are spindle-shaped sleeves that cover penicillar arterioles of the spleen.

Selected writings 
 Über den Übergang körperlicher Bestandteile aus dem Blute in die Lymphgefäße, Leipzig (1861)
 Die Nieren des Menschen und der Säugetiere in ihrem feineren Bau, Halle (1865)
 Über das Centrum tendineum des Zwerchfelles. Arbeiten aus der Physiologischen Anstalt zu Leipzig, with Carl Ludwig (1866)
 Einige Bemerkungen über die rothen Blutkörperchen. Arbeiten aus der Physiologischen Anstalt zu Leipzig, with Alexander Schmidt (1867)
 Die Lymphgefässe der Fascien und Sehnen. Leipzig, with Carl Ludwig (1872)

References 
 Franz Schweigger-Seidel (biography)
 catalogus professorum lipsiensis (biography)
 Color atlas of cytology, histology, and microscopic anatomy by Wolfgang Kühnel (definition of eponym)

1834 births
1871 deaths
People from Halle (Saale)
German physiologists
Academic staff of Leipzig University